NTBK High Madrasah is a Higher Secondary Madrasah situated at Itahar Block, in Uttar Dinajpur district. This school was established in 1972.

Affiliations 
The Madrasah is affiliated to West Bengal Board of Madrasah Education for Upper Primary and Madhyamik and to West Bengal Council of Higher Secondary Education for Higher Secondary section

References 

Madrasas in West Bengal
Schools in Uttar Dinajpur district
1972 establishments in West Bengal
Educational institutions established in 1972